Three ships of the Royal Navy have carried the name HMS Opportune:

She was launched on 20 November 1915 and scrapped in December 1923.
  was an O-class destroyer.  She was launched on 21 February 1942 and scrapped in November 1955.
She was launched on 14 February 1964 and sold in 1992.

Royal Navy ship names